The Tennison Gambit is a chess opening in which White gambits a pawn. The opening moves begin with either the Zukertort Opening:

1. Nf3 d5 2. e4

or the Scandinavian Defense:
1. e4 d5 2. Nf3

The Encyclopaedia of Chess Openings code for the Tennison Gambit is A06.

History
The first person to significantly research this opening was chess amateur Otto Mandrup Tennison (1834–1909). Tennison was born in Denmark, studied in Germany and moved to the United States in 1854. There he played in the chess clubs of New Orleans. Many strong players picked up the idea from the first half of the 20th century.

After 2...dxe4 3.Ng5
White intends to tempt Black to play 3...Nf6 After 4.d3 exd3 5.Bxd3 h6, White wins with 6.Nxf7 Kxf7 7.Bg6+ Kxg6 8.Qxd8. This continuation has been referenced as the "ICBM Variation" by noted players such as IM Levy Rozman. After 4.Bc4 e6 5.Nc3 a6 6.Ngxe4 Nxe4 7.Nxe4 b5 8.Be2 Bb7 9.Bf3 White had the advantage in Ermenkov–Bonchev, Bulgaria 1970.
 3...e5 4.Nxe4 f5! favors Black.
 3...Bf5 and Black is better. The continuation might be 4.Nc3 Nf6 and Black keeps an advantage and a pretty solid position.

Notable games
Nf3 d5 2. e4 dxe4 3. Ng5 f5 4. Bc4 Nh6 5. Nxh7 Rxh7 6. Qh5+ Kd7 7. Qg6 Rh8 8. Be6+ Kc6 9. Bxc8+ Qd6 10. Qe8+ Kb6 11. Qa4  

If 11...Qc6 then 12.Qb3+ Ka6 13.Nc3 any 14.Bxb7+; 11...e6 12.a3, etc. (Tennison)

See also
 List of chess gambits

References

Further reading

 Bekemann, Uwe. (2016). Better late than never – The Tennison Gambit. Schachverlag Ullrich. 
 Lutes, John. (2002). Tennison Gambit. Chess Enterprises. 

18th century in chess
1854 in chess
1854 introductions
Chess openings